Gyromitra gigas, commonly known as the giants false morel, snow morel, snow false morel, calf brain, or bull nose, is a fungus and a member of the Ascomycota.  G. gigas is found in Europe.  It is referred to as one of the false morels, due to its similar appearance and occurrence in the spring and early summer in similar habitats to true morels (Morchella ssp.). It contains small quantities of hydrazines, its content in gyromitrin was scientifically assess by Viernstein et al. [Botanical identification 1980] and resulted of about 1mg per kg of fresh mushroom (roughly 1500 fold less compared to esculenta). No casualties have been ascribed to its consumption, parboiling is still highly recommended. Some guides have listed it as being edible if properly prepared. However, consumption is not recommended due to variability and similarity to other more toxic species of Gyromitra.

This fungus has been banned for sale in France since 1991 due to potential toxicity, the effects of which would cause a fairly rare fatal neurodegenerative disease, amyotrophic lateral sclerosis (ALS). 

A similar and possibly directly related species, Gyromitra montana, occurs in North America; the main difference between the two is the smaller spores G. gigas is reported to have. G. montana is reportedly a good edible mushroom if cooked thoroughly and eaten in small quantities.

Taxonomy
The species was first described scientifically by Julius Vincenz von Krombholz as Helvella gigas.

See also
 Gyromitrin, a toxic chemical found in Gyromitra fungi

References

Discinaceae
Fungi described in 1834
Fungi of Europe
Snowbank fungi